Abdel Hafez Al-Ka'abneh is a Jordanian general that held the post of Chairman of the Joint Chiefs of Staff of the Jordanian Armed Forces from 5 March 2002 to 23 February 2010.

References

1937 births
2016 deaths
Jordanian generals
20th-century Jordanian people